Craig Jason Zucker (born March 23, 1975) is an American politician who serves in the Maryland Senate from the 14th Legislative District. The district includes parts or all of Silver Spring, Calverton, Colesville, Cloverly, Fairland, Burtonsville, Spencerville, Olney, Brookeville, Ashton, Sandy Spring, Brinklow, Laytonsville, Sunshine, Goshen, and Damascus in Montgomery County. He was elected to the Maryland House of Delegates on November 2, 2010, and sworn in on January 12, 2011, then re-elected in 2014 to his second-four-year term. On February 4, 2016, he was sworn into the Maryland State Senate following the retirement of Senator Karen S. Montgomery.

Background 
Zucker was born in Englewood, New Jersey, and raised in nearby Teaneck, New Jersey. He earned his Bachelor of Science from St. Thomas Aquinas College and his master's degree in government from the Johns Hopkins University. He lives in Brookeville, Maryland with his wife Jenny, their two sons and their dog Sophie. Over the years, Zucker has been active in many community organizations, including the Greater Olney Civic Association, Shaare Tefila Congregation, the Olney Theatre Center for the Arts and the Manna Food Center. He also served on Maryland's Joint Task Force on Workplace Fraud.

Career
Zucker has worked in public service since graduating from college in the mid 1990s. He began his career as a scheduling assistant to U.S. Senator Bill Bradley (D-New Jersey) in 1996. He then interned for U.S. Senator Carl Levin (D-Michigan) in 1997, served as scheduler for U.S. Senator Barbara Boxer (D-California) in 1999, and was Legislative Director to Delegate Peter Franchot (D-Takoma Park) from 1999-2000. He went on to serve as Deputy District Director for U.S. Representative Albert R. Wynn from 2000 to 2004. After working for Congressman Wynn, Zucker worked for Service Employees International Union before becoming Deputy Chief of Staff to Comptroller Peter Franchot from 2007-10.

House of Delegates 
Zucker was elected to the Maryland House of Delegates in 2010 and sworn in on January 12, 2011. He was originally assigned to the House Appropriations Committee, the Transportation and the Environment Subcommittee and the Oversight Committee on Pensions.  In November 2012, he was appointed to serve additionally on the Special Joint Committee on Pensions and in 2013 was appointed Vice-Chair of the Appropriations Subcommittee on Public Safety and Administration. After winning re-election, Zucker was promoted to serve as chairman of the Subcommittee on Health and Human Resources on the House Appropriations Committee. He also served on the Capital Budget Subcommittee, and was the House Chair of the Joint Audit Committee.

2011 same-sex marriage debate
Zucker and the other District 14 Delegates were vocal supporters of the same-sex marriage bill in 2011. He was quoted in March of that year as saying, "The District 14 Team and I can't wait to finally cast our yes votes."

State senate
After former Senator Karen Montgomery announced her retirement, the Montgomery County Democratic Central Committee nominated Zucker to replace her. He was sworn in on February 4, 2016.

Awards and honors
 St. Thomas Aquinas College Alumni Hall of Fame, 2011. 
 Legislative Achievement of the Year, Maryland Consumer Rights Coalition, 2012.
 Public Service Award, Olney Theatre Center, 2014
 Outstanding Legislative Leadership Award, The Arc of Maryland, 2015.
 Advocate of the Year, PACT: Kennedy Krieger Institute, Fighting for Families with Developmental Disabilities, 2015.
 The Legislative Award, The Maryland State Medical Society, "For tireless efforts protecting and improving Medicaid on behalf of the patients and physicians of Maryland", 2015.
Outstanding Legislative Leadership Award, The Arc of Maryland, 2016.
Outstanding Legislative Leadership Award, The Arc of Maryland, 2017.
Outstanding Legislative Leadership Award, The Arc of Maryland, 2018.
2018 Legislative Champion, Women Legislators of Maryland.
Legislator of the Year Award, The Arc of Maryland, 2020.

Election results

2002 Democratic Primary
In 2002, as a 27-year-old candidate, Zucker ran a competitive race for the Maryland House of Delegates in the newly created District 14. After losing by just 327 votes, he was asked by the District 14 Democratic winners to serve as the chair of their campaign. 

{| class="wikitable"
|-
!Name
!Votes
!Percent
!Outcome
|-
|- 
|Herman Taylor 
|5352
|  16.3%
|   Won
|-
|- 
|Karen Montgomery
|4678
|  14.5%
|   Won
|-
|- 
|Anne Kaiser
|4280
|  13.3%
|   Won
|-
|- 
| Craig Zucker
|3953 
|  12.3%
|   Lost
|-
|- 
|Allan Mulligan
|2970
|  9.2%
|   Lost
|-
|- 
|Robert “Bo” Newsome
|2391 
|  7.4%
|   Lost
|-
|- 
|Holly Reed
|2217
|  6.9%
|   Lost
|-
|- 
|A. Michael Kelly
|2151 
|  6.7%
|   Lost
|-
|- 
|Michael Dupuy
|1420 
|  4.4%
|   Lost
|-
|- 
|Mike Cafarelli
|1137 
|  3.5%
|   Lost
|-
|- 
|Peter Esser
|848 	
|  2.6%
|   Lost
|-
|- 
|Harold Huggins
|794 
|  2.5%
|   Lost
|}

2010 Democratic Primary

In 2010, Zucker ran again for the House of Delegates after then-Delegates Herman L. Taylor, Jr. and Karen S. Montgomery decided to run for higher offices. This time Zucker was successful in the Democratic primary, coming in second just behind incumbent Delegate Anne Kaiser.

{| class="wikitable"
|-
!Name
!Votes
!Percent
!Outcome
|-
|- 
|Anne Kaiser (incumbent)
|6380
|  24.1%
|   Won
|-
|- 
|Craig Zucker
|6216
|  23.5%
|   Won
|-
|- 
|Eric Luedtke
|3696
|  14%
|   Won
|-
|- 
|Jodi Finkelstein
|3154
|  11.9%
|   Lost
|-
|- 
|Robert "Bo" Newsome
|2834
|  10.7%
|   Lost
|-
|- 
|Gerald Roper
|1660
|  6.3%
|   Lost
|-
|- 
|Neeta Datt
|1288
|  4.9%
|   Lost
|-
|- 
|Vanessa Ali
|1244
|  4.7%
|   Lost
|}

2010 General Election
In the 2010 General Election, Democratic nominees Anne Kaiser, Eric Luedtke and Craig Zucker faced Republican nominees Patricia Fenati, Henry Kahwaty and Maria Peña-Faustino. All Democratic candidates won, with Zucker placing second.

{| class="wikitable"
|-
!Name
!Votes
!Percent
!Outcome
|-
|- 
|Anne Kaiser (incumbent)
|23503
|  21.5%
|   Won
|-
|- 
|Craig Zucker
|22148
|  20.2%
|   Won
|-
|- 
|Eric Luedtke
|21165
|  19.3%
|   Won
|-
|- 
|Patricia Fenati
|14866
|  13.6%
|   Lost
|-
|- 
|Henry Kahwaty
|14152
|  12.9%
|   Lost
|-
|- 
|Maria Peña-Faustino
|13639
|  12.5%
|   Lost
|}

References

External links
 
 
 craigzucker.com
 Maryland State Senate: Craig Zucker
 Craig Zucker Profile

Democratic Party members of the Maryland House of Delegates
Living people
1975 births
Johns Hopkins University alumni
St. Thomas Aquinas College alumni
People from Englewood, New Jersey
People from Brookeville, Maryland
People from Teaneck, New Jersey
21st-century American politicians
Democratic Party Maryland state senators